Aaron Grunger (born 16 May 1978) is an Australian former professional rugby league footballer who played in the 1990s. He played at club level for the Newcastle Knights in 1998.

References

1978 births
Living people
Australian rugby league players
Newcastle Knights players
Place of birth missing (living people)